Lajau is a village in the Federal Territory of Labuan, Malaysia.

Labuan